Choi Myung-gil (born November 11, 1962) is a South Korean actress. Choi received several Best Actress awards for her portrayal of a proprietress who rents out her comic book shop as an overnight shelter in the 1994 film Rosy Life (also known as La Vie en Rose). She has also starred in numerous television dramas, notably Marriage (1993), Tears of the Dragon (1996), Empress Myeongseong (2001), and Again, My Love (2009).

Biography
Choi is married to politician and lawmaker Kim Han-gil; Kim is chairman of the Democratic Party and co-chairman of the New Politics Alliance for Democracy. The couple have two sons.

Filmography

Film

Television series

Awards and nominations

References

External links
 Choi Myung-gil Fan Cafe at Daum
 
 
 
 
 

1962 births
Living people
South Korean film actresses
South Korean television actresses
Seoul Institute of the Arts alumni
Best Actress Paeksang Arts Award (film) winners